(Spanish for "The Ungovernables of Japan" and often spelled without the accent as Los Ingobernables de Japon in English-speaking countries), also shortened to  L.I.J.,  is a Japanese professional wrestling stable, based in the New Japan Pro-Wrestling (NJPW) promotion and led by Tetsuya Naito. An offshoot of the Mexican stable Los Ingobernables from the Consejo Mundial de Lucha Libre (CMLL) promotion, the group was formed in November 2015 by Naito, Bushi and Evil, but came to also include Sanada, Hiromu Takahashi, Shingo Takagi and Titán. Through NJPW's working relationship with other companies, they have also appeared in CMLL and in the American Ring of Honor (ROH) promotion. 

Despite being smaller in numbers than full-scale factions such as Bullet Club or Chaos, Los Ingobernables de Japon has established itself as one of the most prominent and most popular stables in NJPW. Members of the stable have held the top title in the company four times: three reigns as IWGP Heavyweight Champion for Naito, and one reign as IWGP World Heavyweight Champion (the Heavyweight Championship's successor) for Takagi. As part of the stable, Naito also held the IWGP Intercontinental Championship a record six times and was the first wrestler to have held both the Heavyweight and Intercontinental titles simultaneously. The other accomplishments of the stable include two IWGP Tag Team Championship reigns and two G1 Tag League wins for the tag team for Evil and Sanada and one tag reign for Naito and Sanada, six IWGP Junior Heavyweight Championship reigns divided between Bushi and Takahashi, one IWGP Junior Heavyweight Tag Team Championship reign from Bushi and Takagi, one IWGP United States Heavyweight Championship reign from Sanada, three NEVER Openweight Championship reigns from Evil and Takagi, and a record three NEVER Openweight 6-Man Tag Team Championship reigns for Bushi, Evil and Sanada, including a fourth reign for Bushi and Evil with Takagi. In addition to working with CMLL, Bushi has also held the CMLL World Welterweight Championship. Also within the company, Titán was also the first official non-Japanese wrestler to join the stable; overall twenty-nine title reigns took place within the stable. Tokyo Sports cited L.I.J.s impact on NJPW as one of the main factors in the magazine naming Naito the 2016 Wrestler of the Year, a feat he repeated the following year.

History

Origins and background (2013–2016) 

In June 2013, Tetsuya Naito returned to New Japan Pro-Wrestling (NJPW) from a legitimate anterior cruciate ligament injury. Two months later, Naito defeated Hiroshi Tanahashi in the final to win NJPW's premier singles tournament, the G1 Climax. Despite being a clean-cut babyface, Naito was soundly rejected by NJPW fans and his win over Tanahashi was booed. NJPW had pegged Naito as their next top babyface star, but seeing how the fans were reacting to him, the company changed their course of action and announced a fan vote to decide whether the planned IWGP Heavyweight Championship match between Naito and Kazuchika Okada or an IWGP Intercontinental Championship match between Shinsuke Nakamura and Hiroshi Tanahashi would main event the promotion's biggest event of the year, Wrestle Kingdom 8 in Tokyo Dome. The fans voted Nakamura and Tanahashi to main event the show with Naito and Okada relegated to semi-main event. After failing to capture the IWGP Heavyweight Championship from Okada, Naito would remain a step below the top spot in NJPW.

During the summer of 2015, Naito, through a working relationship between NJPW and the Mexican Consejo Mundial de Lucha Libre (CMLL) promotion, worked a tour of CMLL, during which he joined the Los Ingobernables stable. Upon his June return to NJPW, Naito continued representing Los Ingobernables, adopting the villainous attitude associated with the stable, using the fans' rejection of him as a catalyst for the change. In the weeks leading to October's King of Pro-Wrestling event, Naito began teasing bringing in a pareja ("partner") to witness his match against Hiroshi Tanahashi, contested for Tanahashi's contract for a shot at the IWGP Heavyweight Championship at Wrestle Kingdom 10 in Tokyo Dome. At the October 12 event, Takaaki Watanabe, making his NJPW return after a two-year overseas learning excursion, was revealed as Naito's pareja as he attacked Hiroshi Tanahashi during his match with Naito. Watanabe's outside interference was stopped by Hirooki Goto and Katsuyori Shibata, which led to Tanahashi defeating Naito to retain his contract. In a post-match interview, Naito gave Watanabe his new ring name, "King of Darkness" Evil.

Creation and rise to prominence (2015–2016) 
On November 21, Naito and Evil entered the 2015 World Tag League. During the opening night, Bushi, making his return following an injury, debuted as the new third member of the group, which was subsequently dubbed Los Ingobernables de Japon. Naito and Evil ended up making it to the final of the World Tag League, before losing to G.B.H. (Togi Makabe and Tomoaki Honma). On the day of the final, December 9, Bushi offered Máscara Dorada a spot in Los Ingobernables de Japon. After being turned down, Bushi attacked Dorada, unmasked him and stole his CMLL World Welterweight Championship belt. This led to a title match on December 19, where Bushi defeated Dorada with help from his stablemates to bring Los Ingobernables de Japon its first championship. Bushi lost the title back to Dorada during the CMLL and NJPW co-produced Fantastica Mania 2016 tour on January 22, 2016. On February 20, at the NJPW and Ring of Honor (ROH) co-produced Honor Rising: Japan 2016 event, Los Ingobernables de Japon helped Jay Lethal retain the ROH World Championship in a match against Tomoaki Honma. Following the match, both Lethal and his manager Truth Martini joined the stable. While this marked Martini's only appearance as a member of Los Ingobernables de Japon, Lethal continued making sporadic appearances as part of the group over the following months.

On March 12, Naito, with help from both Bushi and Evil, defeated Hirooki Goto in the final to win the 2016 New Japan Cup. With the win, Naito earned the right to challenge for a title of his choosing and chose to face IWGP Heavyweight Champion Kazuchika Okada. On April 10 at Invasion Attack 2016, Sanada debuted as the newest member of Los Ingobernables de Japon, helping Naito defeat Okada for the IWGP Heavyweight Championship. On May 3 at Wrestling Dontaku 2016, Naito made his first successful defense of the IWGP Heavyweight Championship against Okada's Chaos stablemate Tomohiro Ishii. Following the match, Okada, who had earlier in the event defeated Sanada, intimated that he wanted a title rematch with Naito. Also in May, Bushi took part in the 2016 Best of the Super Juniors. Although he failed to advance from his block with a record of four wins and three losses, Bushi scored a major win in his final match of the tournament on June 6 by defeating reigning IWGP Junior Heavyweight Champion Kushida, causing him to miss the final of the tournament. On June 19 at Dominion 6.19 in Osaka-jo Hall, Naito lost the IWGP Heavyweight Championship back to Okada, ending his two-month reign in his second defense. From July 18 to August 13, Naito, Evil and Sanada all took part in the 2016 G1 Climax, with Sanada wrestling in block A and Naito and Evil in block B. All three failed to advance to the final with Naito finishing second in his block with a record of six wins and three losses, while Sanada and Evil both finished with records of four wins and five losses. Naito was victorious over Evil in the head-to-head match between the two stablemates. During the tournament, Naito scored a win over Michael Elgin, which put him in line for a shot at Elgin's IWGP Intercontinental Championship. On August 20, Jay Lethal's association with the stable came to an end, when Naito and Evil abandoned him during a six-man tag team match at an ROH event in Las Vegas, Nevada.

On September 17 at Destruction in Tokyo, Bushi received a shot at the IWGP Junior Heavyweight Championship, which he had earned with the win over Kushida during the 2016 Best of the Super Juniors. Bushi was accompanied to the match by a new unidentified member of the Los Ingobernables de Japon, who had debuted earlier in the week. The match featured outside interference from both Naito and Michael Elgin and ended with Bushi defeating Kushida to bring the IWGP Junior Heavyweight Championship to Los Ingobernables de Japon. On September 25 at Destruction in Kobe, the stable won another title, when Naito defeated Elgin for the IWGP Intercontinental Championship. Bushi lost the IWGP Junior Heavyweight Championship back to Kushida on November 5 at Power Struggle. Later that same event, Evil defeated Katsuyori Shibata to become the new NEVER Openweight Champion. Evil lost the title back to Shibata ten days later in Singapore. The following week, three members of the stable entered the 2016 World Tag League with Evil and Sanada teaming together, while Naito partnered with CMLL wrestler and original Los Ingobernables member Rush. Naito had planned a teamup between the Los Ingobernables and Los Ingobernables de Japon stables for the previous year's tournament, but the CMLL wrestlers had been busy and unable to participate. Naito and Rush finished the tournament on December 7 with a record of four wins and three losses, failing to advance to the final due to losing to block winners Guerrillas of Destiny (Tama Tonga and Tanga Loa) in their final round-robin match. The following day, Evil and Sanada finished their block with a record of five wins and two losses, tied with block winners Togi Makabe and Tomoaki Honma, but failed to advance due to losing to Makabe and Honma in the head-to-head match.

Continued growth and tag team success (2016–2019) 

On December 10, Hiromu Takahashi joined Los Ingobernables de Japon. Takahashi had recently returned to NJPW from a three-year overseas learning excursion, during which he mainly worked for CMLL. On the same show, Bushi, Evil and Sanada defeated Hiroyoshi Tenzan, Yuji Nagata and NEVER Openweight 6-Man Tag Team Champion Satoshi Kojima in a six-man tag team match, after which Bushi made a title challenge against Kojima and his championship partners David Finlay and Ricochet. On January 4, 2017 at Wrestle Kingdom 11 in Tokyo Dome, Bushi, Evil and Sanada defeated Finlay, Ricochet and Kojima as part of a four-team gauntlet match, which also included the Bullet Club trio of Bad Luck Fale, Hangman Page and Yujiro Takahashi and the Chaos trio of Jado, Will Ospreay and Yoshi-Hashi, to become the new NEVER Openweight 6-Man Tag Team Champions. Later that same event, Takahashi defeated Kushida to become the new IWGP Junior Heavyweight Champion. Tetsuya Naito's successful defense of the IWGP Intercontinental Championship against Hiroshi Tanahashi marked a clean sweep for L.I.J., who left Wrestle Kingdom 11 holding three championships.

Following Wrestle Kingdom 11, L.I.J. entered a rivalry with the Taguchi Japan stable over all three of their championships. Naito went on to successfully defend the Intercontinental Championship against Taguchi Japan members Michael Elgin and Juice Robinson, while Takahashi defended the Junior Heavyweight Championship against their stablemates Dragon Lee, Kushida, and Ricochet. Meanwhile, Bushi, Evil and Sanada exchanged the NEVER Openweight 6-Man Tag Team Championship with members of Taguchi Japan multiple times. They first lost the title to Hiroshi Tanahashi, Manabu Nakanishi and Ryusuke Taguchi on January 5, then regained it on February 11 at The New Beginning in Osaka, then lost it to Tanahashi, Taguchi and Ricochet on April 4, before regaining it again on May 3 at Wrestling Dontaku 2017. On June 11 at Dominion 6.11 in Osaka-jo Hall, Takahashi lost the IWGP Junior Heavyweight Championship to the winner of the 2017 Best of the Super Juniors, Kushida. Later that same event, Naito lost the IWGP Intercontinental Championship to Hiroshi Tanahashi.

The following month, three members of L.I.J. took part in the 2017 G1 Climax; Naito in block A and Evil and Sanada in block B. Naito won his block with a record of seven wins and two losses and advanced to the final of the tournament. Meanwhile, Evil finished third in his block with a record of three losses and six wins, one of which came over the reigning IWGP Heavyweight Champion Kazuchika Okada. Sanada, who won the head-to-head match against Evil, finished in the middle of the block with a record of four wins and five losses. On August 13, Naito defeated Kenny Omega in the final to win the 2017 G1 Climax. With Naito now fully embraced by the over 10,000 people in attendance, the win was seen as a conclusion of a four-year arc, which started with Naito's rejection by NJPW fans following his 2013 G1 Climax win and led directly to the creation of Los Ingobernables de Japon. In late 2017, Bushi and Takahashi started teaming regularly in NJPW's junior tag team division. On November 12, Los Ingobernables de Japon made their first appearance in Mexico, when Naito and Takahashi returned to CMLL to team with Rush. The three were defeated in a six-man tag team match, when Rush allowed Volador Jr. to pin himself, reaffirming his previous invitation for Volador to join Los Ingobernables. In December, Evil and Sanada won their block in the 2017 World Tag League with a record of five wins and two losses, advancing to the final of the tournament. On December 11, they defeated Guerrillas of Destiny in the final to win the tournament. Six days later, Bushi, Evil and Sanada lost the NEVER Openweight 6-Man Tag Team Championship to Guerrillas of Destiny and Bad Luck Fale in their fourth defense.

On January 4, 2018, at Wrestle Kingdom 12 in Tokyo Dome, Evil and Sanada defeated the Killer Elite Squad (Davey Boy Smith Jr. and Lance Archer) to win the IWGP Tag Team Championship for the first time. In the main event of the show, Naito unsuccessfully challenged Kazuchika Okada for the IWGP Heavyweight Championship. At Wrestling Hinokuni, Naito defeated Minoru Suzuki to win the IWGP Intercontinental Championship. He eventually lost the title to Chris Jericho at Dominion 6.9 in Osaka-jo Hall. At the G1 Special in San Francisco, Takahashi successfully defended his title against Dragon Lee, but suffered a broken neck during the match, resulting in him becoming inactive and having to vacate the title.

On October 8, 2018 at King of Pro Wrestling, fourteen years-Dragon Gate veteran Shingo Takagi made his surprise NJPW debut as L.I.J.s sixth member, teaming up with Naito, Bushi and Sanada to defeat CHAOS. Takagi would go on to compete in the Junior Heavyweight division, and would stay both undefeated in singles matches and overall unpinned and unsubmitted until June 2019; during this period, he suffered only three defeats in 72 consecutive matches, all of which were tag team matches in which a partner was pinned. He would quickly form a tag team with Bushi; they competed in the Super Junior Tag Tournament, advancing to the final at Power Struggle where they lost to Roppongi 3K in a Three-way tag team match also involving Yoshinobu Kanemaru and El Desperado of Suzuki-Gun.

At Wrestle Kingdom 13, all five active members of the stable won titles: Naito regained the IWGP Intercontinental Championship from Jericho, Evil and Sanada won the IWGP Tag Team Championship by defeating Guerrillas of Destiny and The Young Bucks, and Bushi and Takagi won the IWGP Junior Heavyweight Tag Team Championship by defeating Kanemaru and El Desperado and Roppongi 3K. On February 2 at The New Beginning in Sapporo, Bushi and Takagi retained their titles against Kanemaru and El Desperado, while Evil and Sanada retained their titles against Minoru Suzuki and Zack Sabre Jr., and Naito retained the Intercontinental Championship against Taichi. All five champions lost their titles during the following two months, with Evil and Sanada losing their titles to Guerrillas of Destiny on February 23 at Honor Rising: Japan 2019, Bushi and Takagi losing theirs to Roppongi 3K on March 6 at NJPW's 47th Anniversary Show, and Naito losing the Intercontinental Championship to Kota Ibushi On April 6 at G1 Supercard; also at G1 Supercard, Evil and Sanada lost a Winner takes all four-way tag team match for both their old title and the ROH World Tag Team Championship, which was won by the Guerrillas of Destiny.

From May to June 2019, both Bushi and Takagi took part in the Best of Super Juniors tournament. While Bushi would fail to advance in Block B with 12 points (with six wins and three losses), Takagi won block A by winning all nine of his matches and scoring 18 points; this set up a new record for most victories within the same block, as well as a new record for most points scored at the tournament (not counting the original 1988 tournament which used a different point system). He eventually lost in the final against Block B winner Will Ospreay on June 5, marking his first defeat in New Japan as a singles competitor. The match received considerable acclaim, with Dave Meltzer giving it a rare five and three-quarter out of five rating and calling it "the best junior heavyweight match I’ve ever seen and one of the best matches in any division"; it would go on to be Takagi's final match and only singles loss in the Junior Heavyweight division.

At Dominion 6.9 in Osaka-jo Hall, Naito regained the IWGP Intercontinental Championship from Ibushi, Evil and Sanada failed to capture the Tag Team titles from the Guerrillas of Destiny, and Takagi defeated heavyweight Satoshi Kojima; after his win, Takagi announced his decision to move to the Heavyweight division and declared himself an entrant for the G1 Climax. At the G1 Climax, Evil and Sanada competed in Block A while Naito and Takagi competed in Block B, but all four failed to reach the final. After defeating him during the G1 Climax, Jay White received a title match for Naito's IWGP Intercontinental Championship at Destruction in Kobe, where Naito lost the match and title.

New Japan domination and Evil's betrayal (2019–present) 

In November 2019 at Power Struggle, after Bushi unsuccessfully challenged Will Ospreay for the IWGP Junior Heavyweight Championship, Hiromu Takahashi made his return after sixteen months of absence, challenging Ospreay for a future title match at Wrestle Kingdom 14, which Ospreay accepted. His return match took place on December 19, 2019, during the Road to Tokyo Dome event, 530 days after his last match, with he and Bushi losing to Ospreay and Robbie Eagles.

Wrestle Kingdom 14 was highly successful for Los Ingobernables de Japon; on the first night on January 4, 2020, Takahashi defeated Ospreay to become a three-time IWGP Junior Heavyweight Champion, while Naito regained the IWGP Intercontinental Championship from Jay White, therefore gaining a spot in the following night's main event, where he would face IWGP Heavyweight Champion Kazuchika Okada for both titles. On the second night on January 5, he defeated Okada, becoming the first person in history to hold both titles and winning the main event of Wrestle Kingdom for the first time in his career, while Bushi, Evil and Takagi defeated four other teams in a Gauntlet match for the NEVER Openweight 6-Man Tag Team Championship, making both Bushi and Evil record-tying four time holders of the title. In other matches the second night, Sanada failed to capture the British Heavyweight Championship from Zack Sabre Jr. (making him the only member of the stable not to leave Wrestle Kingdom as champion), and Takahashi teamed up with Ryu Lee to defeat Jushin Thunder Liger and Naoki Sano, in what was Liger's retirement match; after pinning Liger to win the match, Takahashi vowed to him that he would continue the legacy of the junior heavyweight division that Liger had started. At The New Beginning in Sapporo on February 1, Takagi defeated Hirooki Goto to win the NEVER Openweight Championship, making him the first person to hold both NEVER titles at the same time and the second current double champion in Los Ingobernables de Japon with Naito, and giving Los Ingobernables de Japon five of NJPW's eight titles simultaneously (including four of the five singles titles). At The New Beginning in Osaka on February 9, Takahashi successfully defended his title against Ryu Lee (who had injured him and put him out of action for sixteen months in July 2018), while Naito successfully defended both of his titles against Kenta; both Takahashi and Naito then agreed to face each other in a future match.

However, the match never came to be, as New Japan Pro Wrestling temporarily ceased all its activities in late February due to the COVID-19 pandemic. Eventually, the company resumed its activities with the 2020 New Japan Cup, which begun on June 16, 2020, with the winner receiving a title shot against Naito for both of his titles. Bushi, Takagi, Evil, Sanada, and Takahashi would all participate in the tournament, with the latter three making it to the semi-finals, where Takahashi was defeated by Okada while Evil defeated Sanada. During the tournament, Evil displayed a more aggressive behavior, notably cheating during his matches and injuring Yoshi-Hashi before their match in the quarterfinals in order to secure an easy win; In the final on July 11, Evil defeated Kazuchika Okada thanks partly due to an interference by Bullet Club members, who attacked Okada. Although Evil did not appear to notice Bullet Club's involvement in the match (as he was seemingly unconscious when it happened), when Naito came out to congratulate him on his win, Evil attacked him, turning heel and being soon joined by the other members of Bullet Club, establishing himself as a member of the stable and the first member of Los Ingobernables de Japon to ever leave the stable. At Dominion the following day, Evil defeated Naito to capture both the IWGP Heavyweight and IWGP Intercontinental Championships with the help of Bullet Club. At Sengoku Lord on July 25, Takagi successfully defended his NEVER Openweight Championship against El Desperado, while Takahashi was unsuccessful in capturing the Heavyweight and Intercontinental titles from Evil. On August 1, NJPW stripped Bushi, Evil and Takagi of the NEVER Openweight 6-Man Tag Team Championship due to Evil claiming in the wake of his departure that he had "no interest" in defending the title with his former Ingobernables stablemates.

On August 29 at Summer Struggle in Jingu, Takagi lost the NEVER Openweight Championship to Minoru Suzuki, while Takahashi lost the IWGP Junior Heavyweight Championship to Taiji Ishimori, and Naito won the IWGP Heavyweight and Intercontinental Championships back from Evil in the main event. On November 7 at Power Struggle, Takagi regained the NEVER Openweight Championship from Suzuki, while Naito successfully defended both the IWGP Heavyweight and Intercontinental Championships against Evil, making their win–loss record for 2020 tied with two wins each. During November and December, both Bushi and Takahashi participated in the Best of the Super Juniors tournament in a single block where Bushi finished with 8 points, meanwhile Takahashi got through to the final with 14 points and defeated El Desperado to win the tournament for a second time.

On January 4, 2021 at Wrestle Kingdom 15 Night 1, Bushi was one of the final four who emerged from the New Japan Rambo as a winner and would face Toru Yano, Bad Luck Fale and Chase Owens the next night on Night 2 for the KOPW 2021 trophy. Takahashi went on to defeat the Super J-Cup winner El Phantasmo to earn himself a match against Taiji Ishimori the champion the next night for the IWGP Junior Heavyweight Championship. Naito was unsuccessful in defending his IWGP Heavyweight and Intercontinental Championships, as he went on to lose to Kota Ibushi in his second defense. On January 5 at Wrestle Kingdom 15 Night 2, Bushi was unsuccessful in becoming the KOPW 2021 Provisional Champion as he was pinned by Yano. Takagi went on to retain the NEVER Openweight Championship against Jeff Cobb, Sanada defeated Evil in a special singles match and Takahashi was successful in defeating Ishimori to win the IWGP Junior Heavyweight Championship for a fourth time. However, Takahashi had to vacate the title once again after suffering a pectoral muscle injury.

On May 4, 2021 at Wrestling Dontaku 2021, Takagi unccessfully challenged Will Ospreay for the IWGP World Heavyweight Championship (which Ibushi had created after winning the Heavyweight and Intercontinental from Naito, unified them into NJPW's new top title). However, after Ospreay suffered a neck injury during the match and vacated the title, Takagi faced Kazuchika Okada (originally Ospreay's next challenger) for the vacant title on June 7 at Dominion 6.7 in Osaka-jo Hall, where he defeated Okada to win the title, marking his first time winning NJPW's top title and making him the first member of Los Ingobernables de Japon to win the World Heavyweight title. On July 11, 2021 at Summer Struggle in Sapporo, Naito and Sanada defeated Dangerous Tekkers (Taichi and Zack Sabre Jr.) to capture the IWGP Tag Team Championships, however, they lost the back to Taichi and Sabre Jr at Wrestle Grand Slam in Tokyo Dome, ending their reign at just 14 days. The event also saw Takagi defeat Tanahashi to retain the World Heavyweight Championship and the return from injury of Takahashi, who set his sight on the IWGP Junior Heavyweight Championship once more. At Wrestle Grand Slam in MetLife Dome, Takahashi failed to recapture the IWGP Junior Heavyweight Championship from Robbie Eagles, although Takagi retained his World Heavyweight Championship against Evil. Following this, Takagi, Sanada, and Naito all entered the G1 Climax 31 tournament. Unlike the year prior, Sanada failed to win the B Block, finishing with just 8 points. In the A Block, in his opening match against Zack Sabre Jr, Naito suffered a legitimate knee injury and was forced to vacate his following matches, thus finishing bottom of the block with 0 points. Takagi narrowly failed to win the A Block, which was subsequently won by Kota Ibushi, after finishing with 13 points. Sanada and Naito entered the World Tag League, failing to advance to the finals, after finishing with 16 points. Bushi and Takahashi entered the Best of the Super Juniors in November, Bushi failed to advance to the finals after finishing with 10 points, unlike Takahashi, who topped the block with 15 points. In the final, Takahashi defeated Yoh to win his second consecutive Best of the Super Juniors tournament. In the same month, Takagi avenged his G1 loss to Zack Sabre Jr, by retaining the World Heavyweight title at Power Struggle. At Wrestle Kingdom 16, Los Ingobernables de Japon had a poor showing on night one, losing in a six-man tag team match to United Empire, early in the night. After this, Takahashi failed to capture the IWGP Junior Heavyweight Championship once more, after losing to El Desperado. Finally, in the main event, Shingo Takagi, lost the IWGP World Heavyweight Championship, to Kazuchika Okada. On Night two, LIJ had a much better showing, defeating Suzuki-gun in a six-man tag team match. Later in the night, Both Sanada and Naito defeated Great-O-Khan and Jeff Cobb respectively in singles matches. On Night 3, LIJ defeated Pro Wrestling NOAH's, Kongoh stable. 

Following Wrestle Kingdom 16, Naito was announced as the first challenger to Kazuchika Okada's IWGP World Heavyweight Championship. He received his title shot on the final day of NJPW New Years Golden Series, however failed to capture the title. On the night prior to this, Sanada defeated Hiroshi Tanahashi, the capture the IWGP United States Heavyweight Championship, capturing his first NJPW singles championship and bringing the championship to the stable for the first time. Similarly, during the Golden Fight Series tour, Takagi defeated Taichi, to win the provisional Provisional KOPW championship, bringing another title to the stable for the first time. In March, all LIJ members entered the New Japan Cup. Bushi was eliminated early by Will Ospreay in round one, who similarly defeated Sanada, by referee stoppage, in round 3. Takahashi defeated established heavyweight wrestlers, such as Minoru Suzuki and the then NEVER Openweight Champion EVIL, but was eliminated in the quarter-finals by Takagi. Takagi and Naito then both advanced to the semifinals, to face Zack Sabre Jr and Kazuchika Okada respectively. Takagi was defeated by Sabre Jr, however, Naito was able to avenge his loss earlier in the year, by defeating Okada. In the finals, Naito was defeated by Sabre Jr. In the aftermath of the tournament, it was announced that Sanada had fractured his Orbital bone and was therefore required to relinquish his US championship, which he did at Hyper Battle, ending his first reign at 49 days. At the same event, Takahashi was defeated by Evil, who retained the NEVER Openweight Championship. Due to his semi-final win, Naito earned another shot at Okada's IWGP World Heavyweight Championship at Wrestling Dontaku, as he had retained the title against Sabre Jr. At the event, Naito once again failed to defeat Okada. In May, Bushi and Takahshi, entered the Best of the Super Juniors tournament. Bushi failed to advance to the finals, finishing with 8 points in the B block, however Takahashi topped the A block with 12 points, advancing to the finals. In the finals, Takahashi once again defeated El Desperado, to win the Best of the Super Juniors tournament for the record fourth time and the first ever 3-time consecutive winner. Takahashi received his IWGP Junior Heavyweight Championship match at NJPW Road, but failed to win the championship from Taiji Ishimori.

In June, Sanada returned at Dominion 6.12 in Osaka-jo Hall, failing to defeat Will Ospreay for the vacant IWGP United States Heavyweight Championship. Later in the month, Takagi and Takahashi were announced to be competing at AEW x NJPW: Forbidden Door, however, shortly after Takahashi was announced to be taken off of the card, due to suffering from a fever. Therefore, Takagi was announced to be competing in a six-man tag-team match, teaming with Darby Allin and Sting against Bullet Club's El Phantasmo and The Young Bucks, in which Takagi pinned Phantasmo to win the match. The following month, Sanada, Takagi and Naito entered the G1 Climax 32 tournament. In the B block, Sanada finished middle of his block, with 6 points. Takagi narrowly missed out on topping the D Block, after losing to El Phantasmo, thus finishing on 6 points. In the C Block, Naito defeated Sabre Jr to top the C Block, however, lost to Will Ospreay in the semifinal round. In July and September, Takahashi and Takagi made their debuts on NJPW's US show, NJPW Strong. Back in Japan in October, at Declaration of Power, Los Ingobernables de Japon added a new member to the faction, when Titán helped fend off Francesco Akira's attempt to unmask Bushi, during a tag-team match, as post-match Titán was invited to the faction by the LIJ members.

Reception
Dave Meltzer wrote on his Wrestling Observer Newsletter that prior to the formation of L.I.J., Naito was known as "something of a genius in the ring for his ability to lay out matches", but noted that "something didn't click", calling his reception "a combination of some fans booing, and some apathy". However, after copying the Los Ingobernables concept he had seen in Mexico, Naito, according to Meltzer, became "more and more popular for being different", with L.I.J. dress clothes, shirts and masks becoming "the cool wrestling merchandise". According to former Bullet Club leader Kenny Omega, L.I.J. took over Bullet Club's status as "the hottest thing around". When Naito won the 2016 MVP award for Wrestler of the Year from Tokyo Sports, the magazine called Los Ingobernables de Japon a phenomenon that had ushered in a new era. Naito's win ended a five-year run in which the award had been won by either Hiroshi Tanahashi or Kazuchika Okada. The following year, Naito became the fifth wrestler to win the award in consecutive years.

L.I.J. also gained fans outside of professional wrestling. Teruo Iwamoto, a retired soccer player who had represented the Japanese national team, was a lapsed professional wrestling fan until seeing L.I.J. He went on to become close friends with members of the stable, was teased as a possible tag team partner for Naito in the 2016 World Tag League, and was eventually given the honorary role of L.I.J.'s "public relations manager".

During 2017, the Hiroshima Toyo Carp baseball team released Carp de Japon and Tranquilo de Carp shirts, both designed with an L.I.J. theme.

Members

Current

Former members

Former part-time members

Timeline

Championships and accomplishments

Consejo Mundial de Lucha Libre
CMLL World Welterweight Championship (2 times, current) – Bushi (1) and Titán (1, current)
New Japan Pro-Wrestling
IWGP Heavyweight Championship (3 times) – Naito
IWGP Intercontinental Championship (6 times) – Naito
IWGP Junior Heavyweight Championship (6 times, current) – Bushi (1) and Takahashi (5, current)
IWGP Junior Heavyweight Tag Team Championship (1 time) – Bushi and Takagi
IWGP Tag Team Championship (3 times) – Evil and Sanada (2)  and Naito and Sanada (1)
IWGP United States Heavyweight Championship (1 time) – Sanada
IWGP World Heavyweight Championship (1 time) – Takagi
KOPW (2022) – Takagi
NEVER Openweight 6-Man Tag Team Championship (4 times) – Bushi, Evil and Sanada (3) and Bushi, Evil and Takagi (1)
NEVER Openweight Championship (3 times) – Evil (1) and Takagi (2)
Best of the Super Juniors (2018, 2020, 2021, 2022) – Takahashi
G1 Climax (2017) – Naito
New Japan Cup (2016) – Naito 
New Japan Cup (2020) – Evil 
New Japan Rambo (2021) – Bushi 
World Tag League (2017, 2018) – Evil and Sanada
Pro Wrestling Illustrated
Ranked Naito No. 5 of the top 500 singles wrestlers in the PWI 500 in 2020
Ranked Takagi No. 9 of the top 500 singles wrestlers in the PWI 500 in 2021
Ranked Takahashi No. 27 of the top 500 singles wrestlers in the PWI 500 in 2018
Ranked Sanada No. 42 of the top 500 singles wrestlers in the PWI 500 in 2019
Ranked Evil No. 61 of the top 500 singles wrestlers in the PWI 500 in 2019
Ranked Bushi No. 82 of the top 500 singles wrestlers in the PWI 500 in 2016
Ring of Honor
ROH World Championship (1 time) – Lethal
Tokyo Sports
Best Bout Award (2019) – Sanada 
Fighting Spirit Award (2020) - Takahashi
MVP Award (2016, 2017, 2020) – Naito
MVP Award (2021) – Takagi
Wrestling Observer Newsletter
Best Gimmick (2017) – Bushi, Evil, Naito, Sanada, and Takahashi
Japan MVP (2020) – Naito
Match of the Year (2019) – Takagi 
Most Charismatic (2017, 2018) – Naito

Notes
Both CMLL and NJPW have referred to the members of Los Ingobernables and Los Ingobernables de Japon as being part of the same group when members were teaming with one another in tag team matches.

References

External links
 
 
 
 
 

Consejo Mundial de Lucha Libre teams and stables
New Japan Pro-Wrestling teams and stables
Ring of Honor teams and stables
Wrestling Observer Newsletter award winners